Wang Shan Keuk is a village in the North District of Hong Kong.

Administration
Wang Shan Keuk is a recognized village under the New Territories Small House Policy.

History
At the time of the 1911 census, the population of Ha Wang Shan Keuk was 43. The number of males was 16.

References

External links

 Delineation of area of existing village Wang Shan Keuk (Sha Tau Kok) for election of resident representative (2019 to 2022)
 Pictures of Wang Shan Keuk

Villages in North District, Hong Kong